Pethia nigripinna is a species of cyprinid fish found in the Moyar River drainage in the Nilgiris and the Kalindi Stream in the southern Western Ghats.  This species can reach a length of  SL.

References 

Pethia
Fish described in 2012